Holroyd may refer to:

People
 Alexandre Holroyd, French politician
 Charles Holroyd (1861–1917), English artist and curator
 Chris Holroyd (born 1986), English footballer
 Edward Dundas Holroyd (1828–1916), Australian judge
 Edwin Holroyd (1855–1914), English cricketer
 Fred Holroyd, British soldier in Northern Ireland in the 1970s
 Henry Holroyd, 3rd Earl of Sheffield
 John Baker Holroyd, 1st Earl of Sheffield
 Michael Holroyd (born 1935), English biographer
 Shelley Holroyd (born 1973), English female javelin thrower
 Stuart Holroyd (born 1933), British writer
 Thomas Holroyd (1821–1904), British portrait and landscape painter

Places
 Holroyd, New South Wales, a suburb of Sydney, Australia
 Holroyd River, a locality in the Shire of Cook, Queensland, Australia
 City of Holroyd, a defunct local government area in western Sydney, Australia

Other uses
 Holroyd v Marshall, a 1862 judicial decision of the House of Lords, U.K.
 Holroyd High School, Greystanes, New South Wales
 Holroyd River, Cape York Peninsula, Queensland, Australia

See also
 Holyrood (disambiguation)